Eddie Mast (October 3, 1948 – October 18, 1994) was an American professional basketball player who played for the New York Knicks and Atlanta Hawks of the National Basketball Association (NBA).

College career
Mast played collegiately for Temple between 1966 and 1969. He grabbed 22 rebounds to help the Owls beat Boston College and win the 1969 National Invitation Tournament.

Professional career
Mast was drafted by the New York Knicks in the 3rd round (40th overall) of the 1969 NBA draft. He was not offered a contract and played a season for the Allentown Jets in the Eastern League, winning Rookie of the Year.
He eventually signed for the Knicks in September 1970.
After playing sparingly for two seasons, Mast was traded to the Atlanta Hawks in October 1972 for a second round pick in the 1973 NBA draft.

He wasn't much more successful for the Hawks, posting 2.8 points on average (42 per cent field goal accuracy) and lacking the muscle under the boards to take more than 3.2 rebounds a game. He was released by the team in July 1973.
Rejoining the Knicks during the 1974 offseason, he was cut in September before league play began.

Mast played for the Belgium Lions of the European Professional Basketball League in early 1975.
He joined the Kentucky Colonels of the American Basketball Association in September 1975. He was waived a month later before playing a game for the Colonels.  
Mast ultimately spent most of his career in the Eastern League (later renamed Continental Basketball Association), serving as player coach for the Lehigh Valley Jets (formerly Allentown) until they folded in 1981.

Later life
Following his retirement as a player, Mast served as sales executive and partner for World Timber Corp. in Easton, Pennsylvania (having previously been a salesman for Martin Guitar in Nazareth).
He served as boys basketball head coach at Louis E. Dieruff High School in Allentown, Pennsylvania from 1983 to 1985. He also coached Easton Catholic Youth Organization boys and girls basketball teams.

Death
Mast died of a heart attack on October 18, 1994 while playing a pick-up game of basketball at the Kirby Field House on the campus of Lafayette College. He was said to suffer from Pete Maravich syndrome. Aged 46 at the time of his passing, he had a wife and five children.

External links
 Real GM profile Retrieved on 20 November 2017

References 

1948 births
1994 deaths
American men's basketball players
Atlanta Hawks players
Basketball coaches from Pennsylvania
Basketball players from Philadelphia
Continental Basketball Association coaches
High school basketball coaches in the United States
Louis E. Dieruff High School alumni
New York Knicks draft picks
New York Knicks players
Power forwards (basketball)
Sportspeople from Philadelphia
Temple Owls men's basketball players